Radja Nainggolan (born 4 May 1988) is a Belgian professional footballer who plays as a midfielder for  club SPAL.

Nicknamed Il Ninja, he spent almost his entire professional career in Italy, representing Piacenza, Cagliari, Roma and Inter Milan. He made 367 appearances and scored 48 goals in Serie A, being named four consecutive times in its Team of the Year. 

A Belgium international for eight years, Nainggolan played 30 times for his country (scoring six goals) and represented it at Euro 2016.

Early life
Nainggolan was born in Antwerp, the son of Lizy Bogaerts, a Belgian of Flemish ethnicity who raised him with his three half brothers and his twin sister, and Marianus Nainggolan, an Indonesian of Batak background and member of the Batak Christian Protestant Church. He was raised in Kiel, a working-class and multicultural neighbourhood of the city. His father abandoned the family when Radja was still a child.

Nainggolan's mother died in 2010, and after her death he tattooed two large wings on his back with her dates of birth and death. He was raised Roman Catholic and speaks Dutch, English, French and Italian fluently.

Club career

Piacenza
Nainggolan began playing football with Tubantia Borgerhout at the age of 5. Seven years later he moved to the youth team of Germinal Beerschot, where he remained until 2005, when he moved to Italian Serie B club Piacenza. He made his senior debut on 28 May 2006 during a home defeat to Arezzo, being inserted permanently into the first team the following season.

In the 2008–09 campaign, Nainggolan became a starter for the Emilia-Romagna side, playing 38 of 42 games and scoring three goals, which contributed to them avoiding relegation.

Cagliari
On 27 January 2010, Nainggolan was loaned to Cagliari with a buyout clause. He made his Serie A debut on 7 February, playing seven minutes in a 3–0 away loss against Inter Milan. After making seven appearances (including being sent off a few minutes after entering the field on 28 February against Chievo), the club announced it had acquired 50% of his rights in a co-ownership deal.

In the first part of 2010–11, under manager Pierpaolo Bisoli, Nainggolan started often due to the absence of Daniele Conti. On 31 October 2010 he scored his first goal in the Italian top division, from a right-footed volley in a 2–0 home win over Bologna. On 31 January 2011, Cagliari redeemed the second half of his contract from Piacenza.

In early October 2013, after three seasons as an undisputed first-choice, Nainggolan agreed to an extension until 2016. His performances with the Rossoblu made him especially popular among their fans, who named him in a top 11 list comprising the best players in the history of the Sardinian club.

Roma

On 7 January 2014, Nainggolan was loaned to fellow top-flight team Roma until the end of the campaign for a fee of €3 million, with an option to purchase 50% of his rights in the ensuing summer for €6 million. He made his debut two days later, starting in a 1–0 home victory over Sampdoria for the Coppa Italia which qualified for the quarter-finals. In the same competition, he also helped dispose of Juventus in said stage by playing the full 90 minutes at the end of the month.

On 22 February 2014, Nainggolan scored his first goal for the capital side, grabbing the 1–0 winner against Bologna. His second, which arrived on 19 April against Fiorentina (same result) ensured his team automatic qualification to the UEFA Champions League.

Nainggolan signed a permanent deal with Roma in the 2015 off-season, for €9 million. On 6 July 2016 he renewed his contract until June 2020, extending it a further year the following summer.

Inter Milan
On 26 June 2018, Nainggolan signed with Inter Milan for €38 million (€24 million plus Davide Santon and Nicolò Zaniolo, valued at €14 million) until June 2022. He scored in his league debut on 1 September, helping the visitors defeat Bologna 3–0, and just over a month later he netted the equaliser in a 2–1 comeback win at PSV in the Champions League group stage to become the first-ever Belgian to score for the club in the competition.

In August 2019, Nainggolan returned to Cagliari on a season-long loan. He was named the league's MVP for November, with two long-range goals and three assists in three matches to help his team to reach fourth place. 

Nainggolan returned to the Sardegna Arena on 31 December 2020, again on loan.

Antwerp
On 10 August 2021, Inter Milan announced that Nainggolan's contract with the club had been terminated by mutual consent; four days later, the 33-year-old signed a two-year deal with Antwerp. He made his debut in his country's First Division on 22 September, starting in the 4–2 home victory against Genk. His first goal in the competition was the game's only away to neighbours Beerschot on 5 December, and he dedicated the goal to his late mother whose honour had been insulted by the local fans.

On 17 October 2022, Nainggolan was suspended indefinitely by Antwerp after being arrested for driving with an expired driver's licence and later smoking an electronic cigarette on the bench ahead of a 3–0 loss at Standard Liége. In December, he left by mutual consent.

SPAL
After weeks of speculation, on 30 January 2023 Nainggolan officially joined Italian second-tier club SPAL, coached by former Roma team-mate and friend Daniele De Rossi, on a free transfer, signing a five-month contract with an option for one more season in case of promotion.

International career

Due to his father's heritage, Nainggolan was eligible to represent both Indonesia and Belgium, but ultimately chose to play for the latter nation. He took part at the 2007–09 International Challenge Trophy finals, a tournament which the under-23 team won.

Nainggolan earned his first senior cap on 29 May 2009, against Chile in the Kirin Cup. He scored his first goal for the Red Devils on 5 March 2014, in a 2–2 friendly draw with Côte d'Ivoire.

On 13 May 2014, Nainggolan was selected in a standby list for the 2014 FIFA World Cup. He did not make the final cut, however.

Nainggolan was a starter for the Marc Wilmots-led side during the UEFA Euro 2016 qualifying campaign. He scored in an away draw with Bosnia and Herzegovina, and a 4–1 win in Andorra as the team qualified for the tournament for the first time in 16 years.

Nainggolan was selected to the finals in France. He made his debut in the tournament on 13 June, playing 62 minutes in a 2–0 loss against Italy. After featuring as a second-half substitute in the second game, a 3–0 defeat of the Republic of Ireland, he returned to the starting XI against Sweden, scoring the game's only goal at the Stade de Nice after a counter-attack to send his country to the knockout stage as second; in the quarter-finals, he netted from 25 metres to put his country ahead against Wales after 12 minutes, but in an eventual 3–1 loss.

On 26 August 2017, aged 29, Nainggolan announced that he would be retiring from international football after not being selected for Belgium's upcoming World Cup qualifiers, and stated that he would be focusing on his club career with Roma. However, he was selected by new manager Roberto Martínez for friendlies against Mexico and Japan in November, only to pull out due to injury.

On 21 May 2018, after once again not being picked for the upcoming World Cup in Russia, Nainggolan retired from the international scene.

Style of play
Considered by many experts to be one of the best and most complete midfielders in Europe, due to his ability to aid his team both offensively and defensively, Nainggolan is a quick, dynamic, hard-working, physically strong and versatile midfielder, who is capable of playing in several midfield positions; possessing good vision, passing range, and technique, he is often used as a playmaker in front of his team's defensive line. He is also known for his attacking drive, ability to get forward and eye for goal from midfield, courtesy of his powerful and accurate striking ability from distance, as well as his movement and ability to make late attacking runs off the ball; his talent, energy, skill, and wide range of attributes led to him being used in a more offensive role as an advanced playmaker behind the two forwards during his time with Cagliari.

Due to his pace, stamina, tenacity and aggressive tackling, as well as his willingness and ability to chase down and press opponents off the ball, Nainggolan is also a good ball-winner, and has frequently been used in a box-to-box role; he is also capable of playing as a winger. After his move to Roma, he was mainly deployed as a central or defensive midfielder in a 4–3–3 formation or in the "mezzala" role, and on occasion even as a right-back; following the arrival of Luciano Spalletti, however, he returned to playing in a more advanced role as an attacking midfielder or second striker in a 4–2–3–1 or a 3–4–2–1 formation. He has also been used in a more central or attacking role on occasion, or even as a false attacking midfielder.

In addition to his footballing abilities, Nainggolan has also been praised for his leadership in the media, although he has also drawn criticism for his difficult character and his involvement in several controversial incidents off the pitch.

Outside of football

Personal life
Nainggolan married Claudia Lai, with the couple being parents to daughters Aysha (b. 2012) and Mailey (b. 2016). His twin sister, Riana, is also a footballer; she is openly lesbian and he spoke out against homophobia.

On 10 July 2019, Lai confirmed in an Instagram post that she had been diagnosed with cancer and would begin chemotherapy treatment.

Controversy
Nainggolan smoked cigarettes during his playing career. On New Year's Eve 2018, he became the subject of strong controversy in Italy after he posted a video on Instagram cursing, drinking alcohol and smoking.

Career statistics

Club

International

Scores and results list Belgium's goal tally first, score column indicates score after each Nainggolan goal.

Honours
Inter Milan
Serie A: 2020–21

Individual
Serie A Team of the Year: 2014–15, 2015–16, 2016–17, 2017–18
A.S. Roma Player of the Season: 2016–17
Serie A Player of the Month: November 2019

References

External links

1988 births
Living people
Indo people
Belgian people of Indonesian descent
People of Batak descent
Belgian Roman Catholics
Belgian twins
Twin sportspeople
Sportspeople of Indonesian descent
Flemish sportspeople
Belgian footballers
Footballers from Antwerp
Association football midfielders
Belgian Pro League players
Beerschot A.C. players
Royal Antwerp F.C. players
Serie A players
Serie B players
Piacenza Calcio 1919 players
Cagliari Calcio players
A.S. Roma players
Inter Milan players
S.P.A.L. players
Belgium youth international footballers
Belgium under-21 international footballers
Belgium international footballers
UEFA Euro 2016 players
Belgian expatriate footballers
Expatriate footballers in Italy
Belgian expatriate sportspeople in Italy